Marcílio Marques Moreira (born in Rio de Janeiro, November 25, 1931), was the Brazilian Minister of Finance during the government of Fernando Collor de Mello, responsible for overseeing the Plano Collor. He was also the Brazilian ambassador to the United States in 1986.

He is now Principal at the Conjuntura e Contexto consultancy firm, a member of the boards of the Brazilian division of the American Bank Note Company and ENERGISA, chairman of the advisory board of the institute on the Ethics of Corporate Competition, and vice-chairman of the Board of INAE - Forum Nacio.

Bibliography

References 
 
 
 

|-

1931 births
Brazilian economists
People from Rio de Janeiro (city)
Finance Ministers of Brazil
Government ministers of Brazil
Living people
Ambassadors of Brazil to the United States